Stalin's bunker is an air raid shelter located near Samara State University of Culture in Samara (former Kuybyshev), Russia. It is a subterranean bunker complex constructed between February and October 1942. It was the alternative Supreme High Command General Headquarters of the Soviet Armed Forces  intended for Joseph Stalin during World War II. Stalin's Bunker was declassified in 1990. Now the civil defence museum occupies the former air raid shelter. The air-raid shelters for the Soviet High Command were built also in Yaroslavl, Gorky (now Nizhny Novgorod), Kazan, Ulyanovsk, Saratov and Stalingrad (now Volgograd).

History  
During World War II, Kuybyshev was chosen to be the alternative capital of the Soviet Union should Moscow fall to the invading Germans. In October 1941, the Communist Party and governmental organizations, diplomatic missions of foreign countries, leading cultural establishments and their staff were evacuated to the city.

On 15 October 1941 the State Defense Committee produced a secret decision No 801 "On evacuation of the Soviet capital Moscow to Kuybyshev". Evacuation of Stalin was envisaged in case of emergency. 21 October 1941 the State Defense Committee produced a secret decision No 826 "On construction of the air raid shelter in Kuybyshev". The Stalin's Bunker was designed by Chief Technology Officer Yulian Ostrovsky and main architect M. Zelenin. They copied construction of Aeroport Moscow Metro station. Subway tunnelers from Moscow and Donbas miners were deployed for the construction of the bunker works. 2900 workers and 800 engineers took part in the construction. Mine-surveying work was steered by I. Drobinin. All builders were under a lifelong gag order. Soil withdrawal was carried out at night. 25,000 cubic meters (880,000 cu. ft.) of soil was recovered in 8 months. 5,000 cubic meters (180,000 cu. ft.) of concrete have been used in the construction. The Stalin's Bunker was put in the operation by government commission on 6 January 1943.

Ironically, Joseph Stalin insisted on staying in Moscow throughout the Battle of Moscow.  His daughter Svetlana did shelter in the bunker during the air strikes, but Stalin himself never had any documented visits to the bunker.

Description 
Stalin's bunker was designed to survive an explosion equivalent to  kilograms (2 tons) of TNT. Defensive measures include 23 meters (75') of earthen cover, 4 meters (13') of concrete, and a layer of sand for protection against enemy air raids. The bunker has a power station and a stand-alone system of air regeneration. There are workrooms on the 4th, 5th, 6th and 7th floors. After descending the stairs into the lower section and passing through the steel door, there is a long corridor. On the right side is Stalin's accommodation. On the left side is a convention hall. Several floors up, there's  a series of rooms which include a generator, ventilation equipment, accumulators, an elevator motor, pump rooms and the telephone switchboard.

See also 
 Führerbunker
 Matsushiro Underground Imperial Headquarters
 Presidential Emergency Operations Center

References 

Places associated with Joseph Stalin
Continuity of government
Bunkers in Europe
Air raid shelters
Buildings and structures in Samara, Russia
Cultural heritage monuments of regional significance in Samara Oblast